Rainbach im Innkreis is a municipality in the district of Schärding in the Austrian state of Upper Austria.

Geography
Rainbach lies in the Innviertel. About 21 percent of the municipality is forest, and 72 percent is farmland.

References

Cities and towns in Schärding District